Million Dollar Listing is an American reality television series franchise on the Bravo network. Each show chronicles the professional and personal lives of real estate agents based in a major American city as they sell high-end properties, giving viewers an inside look at the world of high-priced real estate.

The franchise began with the show Million Dollar Listing Los Angeles (originally Million Dollar Listing), which debuted on August 29, 2006. That series has since aired 14 seasons.

The success of the Los Angeles based version of the show spawned three other shows in the same franchise:

Million Dollar Listing Miami - 1 season, 2014
Million Dollar Listing New York - 9 seasons, 2012-2021
Million Dollar Listing San Francisco - 1 season, 2015

Additionally, Million Dollar Listing New York spawned two shows starring broker Ryan Serhant: Million Dollar Listing New York: Ryan’s Wedding and Sell it Like Serhant.

The Million Dollar Listing franchise was parodied in the 2016-19 streaming comedy series Bajillion Dollar Propertie$.

References

Bravo (American TV network) original programming
Reality television series franchises
Property buying television shows